The 1978 Formula One season was the 32nd season of FIA Formula One motor racing. It featured the 1978 World Championship of F1 Drivers and the International Cup for F1 Constructors, contested concurrently over a sixteen race series which commenced on 15 January and ended on 8 October. The season also included the non-championship BRDC International Trophy.

Mario Andretti won the Drivers' World Championship, driving for JPS-Lotus. He remains the last American driver to win the World Championship. His victory at the Dutch Grand Prix is also the last for an American driver. Ronnie Peterson was awarded second place in the Drivers' standings posthumously, having died from medical complications after an accident at Monza during the Italian Grand Prix. JPS-Lotus won the International Cup for F1 Constructors.

Championship defendants Niki Lauda and Ferrari had parted ways late in 1977, and both parties struggled to repeat the successes they had enjoyed the previous seasons. Carlos Reutemann finished third in the championship in the lead Ferrari, while Lauda finished fourth with Brabham. Apart from Peterson's death, the year saw another tragedy when Peterson's Swedish compatriot Gunnar Nilsson died from cancer, having been forced to cut his career short after the previous season because of the disease. It was the last championship for Lotus, before their withdrawal in 1994.

As of 2022, this is the last championship for an American driver.

Drivers and constructors
The following drivers and constructors contested the  1978 World Championship of F1 Drivers and the International Cup for F1 Constructors.

Calendar

Calendar changes 
The Brazilian Grand Prix was moved from Autodromo de Interlagos in São Paulo to Jacarepaguá in Rio de Janeiro for 1978.

The Spanish Grand Prix was moved from early May to early June.

The French Grand Prix was moved from Dijon-Prenois to Paul Ricard Circuit, in keeping with the event-sharing arrangement between the two circuits.

The British Grand Prix was moved from Silverstone to Brands Hatch, in keeping with the event-sharing arrangement between the two circuits.

The Canadian Grand Prix was moved from Mosport Park to the Île Notre-Dame Circuit because of track safety and organization problems with the hilly and scenic Mosport Park track.

The Japanese Grand Prix was originally scheduled on 16 April at the Suzuka Circuit after Fuji's contract was torn up, but it was cancelled for safety and financial reasons.

Season report
The 1978 World Championship of F1 Drivers and the International Cup for F1 Constructors were contested concurrently over a sixteen-race series.

Race 1: Argentina
The 1978 season started at the varied Parque Almirante Brown circuit in Buenos Aires, Argentina, where Mario Andretti took pole in his Lotus, with home favourite Carlos Reutemann's Ferrari joining him on the front row and Ronnie Peterson in the other Lotus third on the grid. The start was uneventful, with Andretti and Reutemann easily keeping first and second, with John Watson in the Brabham taking third from Peterson. Watson took second from Reutemann on the seventh lap, but Andretti was uncatchable. Reutemann ran third for a while but then began to drop down the order due to tire problems, so reigning world champion Niki Lauda took third in his Brabham, which became second with ten laps left when Watson's engine blew up. Andretti motored on to a crushing victory, with Lauda second and Patrick Depailler's Tyrrell taking the final spot on the podium. This had been an unusual Argentine Grand Prix- although the summer weather had been usually hot (although not as hot as the previous year), the attrition rate hadn't been as high, nor had the polesitter retired.

Race 2: Brazil
Brazil was the country where the drivers traveled for the second round of the season. Formula One made its first visit to the new Jacarepagua Autodrome in Rio de Janeiro, after six years at the very bumpy and demanding Interlagos circuit in São Paulo – the Jacarepagua circuit was to be visited by Formula One for the rest of the next decade. The typically extreme weather during January in Rio meant that this race was run in oppressively hot and humid conditions. Peterson took pole with James Hunt driving for McLaren beating Andretti to second. At the start, Reutemann beat the trio into the first corner, with Hunt and Andretti following, as Peterson got a bad start. Hunt ran second until he had to pit for tyres, as a result, Andretti took the place until late in the race when he suffered gearbox issues, which handed second to Fittipaldi and third to Lauda. Hunt eventually spun out of the race after being caught out by the hot and humid conditions on lap 26, as did Tambay on lap 35 and Villeneuve one lap later. Reutemann was never headed at the front and went to win comfortably, with double world champion Emerson Fittipaldi in his brother's team finishing second, and Lauda third, with both overhauling an ailing Andretti towards the end, who eventually finished 4th ahead of Regazzoni and Pironi who rounded out the top 6.

Race 3: South Africa
After a long break, the season resumed at the Kyalami circuit in South Africa for the 300th World Championship Grand Prix, where defending champion Lauda took his first pole for Brabham with Andretti alongside and Hunt next. Andretti took the lead at the start, and set about building a gap, whereas Lauda dropped behind Jody Scheckter's Wolf. Young Italian Riccardo Patrese was on a charge in the Arrows, passing Lauda for third after 20 laps. As the race continued, both Andretti and Scheckter began to suffer from tyre issues and were passed by Patrese. Depailler was up to second ahead of Lauda, but the latter's engine failed, handing third to Andretti. Patrese, however, seemed to have the race in his pocket until his engine failed, and Depailler took the lead, but his Tyrrell began to trail smoke. Andretti was up to second, but he had to pit for fuel, and thus his teammate Peterson took the place before catching and passing Depailler on the last lap to win after some wheel-banging. Watson completed the podium.

Race 4: United States West

The next race was in the famous Long Beach circuit near Los Angeles in the American state of California. The Ferraris dominated qualifying, with Reutemann taking pole ahead of teammate Gilles Villeneuve, with defending champion Lauda and home hero Andretti on the second row. When the race started, Watson in fifth late-braked all into turn one, though he ran wide and Villeneuve took the lead, whereas Reutemann dropped down to fourth behind Lauda. The Ferraris, with the two Brabhams in between, ran together until Watson's engine failed. Alan Jones's Williams was up to fourth and closed in on the now lead trio, which became a duo when Lauda went out with an electrical failure. Villeneuve and Reutemann ran 1–2, with Jones putting both under pressure before Villeneuve also retired after colliding with a backmarker. Jones suffered from fuel pressure problems and began to drop back, handing second to Andretti, to the fans' delight. The rest of the race passed without incident, and with all challengers out of contention, Reutemann won comfortably ahead of Andretti and Depailler.

Race 5: Monaco
Round Five took place in Monaco after an extended gap once the Japanese Grand Prix at the Suzuka circuit was cancelled. Once again, Reutemann started on pole with the Brabham duo of Watson and Lauda second and third. Watson had a good start and led into the first corner, whereas Reutemann collided with Hunt and had to pit for repairs, which left Depailler and Lauda second and third. For the first half of the race, the top three remained the same until Watson had an off allowing Depailler and Lauda through, but the latter then suffered a puncture and had to pit for tyres before charging back up and retaking second from Watson towards the end of the race. At the front, Depailler took his first career victory, with Lauda second and Scheckter third after Watson made another mistake in the final laps.

Race 6: Belgium
The main news before the Belgian GP at Zolder was that the new Lotus 79 was ready to race, and immediately Andretti showed its pace by taking pole comfortably from Reutemann and Lauda. He converted it to a first-corner lead, whereas Reutemann had a bad start and got swamped by the field, causing a chain reaction in which Lauda was hit by Scheckter and had to retire. This left Villeneuve second and Peterson third, but neither could keep pace with Andretti, who was able to drive away.

The first 40 laps went without incident until Villeneuve suffered a puncture and had to pit, which dropped him back down to fifth. A few laps later, Peterson also pitted for new tyres leaving the charging Reutemann second ahead of Jacques Laffite's Ligier. Peterson, on the new tyres, was much quicker and could pass them both in the closing stages, and Laffite attempted to pass Reutemann on the last lap, but they collided, and Laffite was out. Andretti cruised to an untroubled victory, with Peterson making it a Lotus 1–2 and Reutemann completing the podium.

Race 7: Spain
The next race was at the tight, twisty Jarama circuit near Madrid in Spain. Once again, the new Lotus 79 demonstrated its speed, with Andretti on pole again with Peterson alongside, and Reutemann had to settle for the second row. It was Hunt who got a great start and led into the first corner from Andretti and Reutemann, with Peterson dropping back to ninth. Hunt led for seven laps before Andretti passed him and pulled away. Reutemann ran third until he had to pit for tyres, so Watson inherited third until Laffite passed him, but soon the recovering Peterson passed both of them. Hunt now suffered from tyre problems, and he also began to drop back, and so Peterson was able to take second and Laffite third. That was how it ended: Andretti won over Peterson in another Lotus 1–2, and Laffite got the final spot on the podium.

Race 8: Sweden
Before the Swedish GP at the isolated Anderstorp circuit, the Brabham team had developed a new "fan car" much to the anger of the other teams, but the FIA allowed it to race. However, it did not stop Andretti from continuing his pole run, but it got Watson to qualify second and Lauda third- while running on full fuel tanks. When the race started, Andretti led into the first corner, with Lauda getting second from his teammate. Riccardo Patrese got up to third in his Arrows until home driver Peterson passed him, but by then, Andretti and Lauda had escaped. Peterson struggled with a slow puncture, whereas Andretti and Lauda battled, with Andretti making a mistake just after mid-distance, allowing Lauda to take the lead. Lauda went on to win the race, his first for Brabham after Andretti's challenge ended due to an engine failure, which left Patrese and Peterson to take second and third. This was the last Swedish Grand Prix to date-with the deaths of Ronnie Peterson and Gunnar Nilsson, Swedish interest faded in Formula One, and there was no money for the race to be held.

Race 9: France
Brabham was forced to revert to their previous car, but it did not deter them, with Watson on pole and Lauda starting third behind Andretti. At the start, Watson led into the first corner, with Andretti following and Patrick Tambay putting his McLaren in third, but that order did not remain for long as Andretti took the lead from Watson on the first lap. Lauda and Peterson were also on the move as they passed Watson and Tambay to jump into second and third, but Lauda suffered another engine failure. This left the two Lotus cars running 1–2, and they finished like that, with Andretti taking his third win in four races, and the podium was completed by Hunt, who passed Watson mid-race.

Race 10: Great Britain
The field went to Britain for the next round, and this time it was Peterson who beat Andretti to pole, as Lotus took the front row, with Scheckter next up on the second row. Andretti took the lead at the start from Peterson, and the two Lotus cars quickly pulled out a gap until Peterson retired with an engine failure. Andretti had a big lead to Scheckter and continued to extend it until he had to pit with a puncture, and he eventually retired when his engine also failed. Scheckter inherited the lead, but Lauda put him under pressure and took the lead before Scheckter went out with gearbox problems. This put Reutemann up to second, closing down and passing Lauda in the late stages of the race to win. Lauda had to settle for second, and his teammate Watson took a podium in his home race.

Race 11: West Germany
The West German race was next on the calendar, and there were no surprises in qualifying, with Andretti on pole and Peterson alongside him, with Lauda third. At the start, Peterson got off better and took the lead from Andretti, but he held it for only four laps before Andretti retook it. Lauda ran third in the early stages, but Alan Jones passed him, and the duo battled until Lauda's engine failed yet again. The two Lotus cars were cruising at the front, and Jones ran third comfortably until he retired with a fuel vaporization problem. Lotus's hopes of a 1–2 ended when Peterson's gearbox failed, but Andretti was unaffected by that and cruised to his fifth win of the season, with Scheckter second and Laffite third.

Race 12: Austria
The crowds for the Austrian GP were full of Lauda fans; however, for them, Lauda qualified only 12th as the Lotus cars again took the front row, with Peterson on pole. The surprise in qualifying was Jean-Pierre Jabouille, who qualified his turbocharged Renault third. The start saw Peterson lead into the first corner, with Reutemann snatching second from Andretti. Andretti tried to get the place back later in the lap, but the two collided, and Andretti retired after his car spun into the barriers while Reutemann lost a couple of places to Patrick Depailler and Scheckter. On the fourth lap, a heavy rainshower hit the track, and Reutemann spun off and was beached, but the marshals push-started his car as it was in a dangerous position, while Scheckter crashed out, and the race was stopped.

The race restarted after the rain relented, and once again, Peterson led, followed by Depailler and Lauda. As the track began to dry, Peterson started to pull away, and behind, Reutemann was on a charge and passed Lauda for third. Still, he was black-flagged for receiving outside assistance, and Lauda crashed out soon after, leaving Gilles Villeneuve third. The drivers changed to slicks, but the top 3 remained the same until the end; Peterson won ahead of Depailler, with Villeneuve taking his first-ever podium.

Race 13: The Netherlands
The drivers went to the Netherlands for the next race, qualifying as expected, Andretti taking pole with Peterson alongside in the all-Lotus front row and Lauda heading the second row. At the start, Andretti led with Peterson following, whereas Jacques Laffite challenged Lauda. The Lotus cars quickly built up a good gap, while Laffite challenged Lauda early on but then began to drop down the order with tyre issues. The race was relatively uneventful, and Andretti went to take victory, with Peterson completing another Lotus 1–2, leaving Lauda to take third.

Race 14: Italy
The Italian race was host to round fourteen, and as usual, Andretti took pole with Gilles Villeneuve pleasing the Ferrari fans by qualifying second, ahead of Jabouille's turbocharged Renault. When the race started, Andretti and Villeneuve got away comfortably, with Lauda and Jabouille following, but the rest of the field was bunched up.

Riccardo Patrese's Arrows overtook many of the cars on the right-hand side of the circuit next to the pitlane since he got a rolling start when the starter Gianni Restelli started the race prematurely. He rejoined the other cars just in front of the blocked entrance to the old Monza banking, and James Hunt got so surprised that he veered left and hit Peterson's Lotus 78 with his left front wheel. Peterson spun right and rammed the right Armco barrier hard, head-on; the front end of his Lotus 78 was crushed during the impact. Seven other drivers were collected: Carlos Reutemann, Hans Joachim Stuck, Patrick Depailler, Didier Pironi, Vittorio Brambilla, and Clay Regazzoni. Peterson's car broke in two on impact with the barriers and caught fire, and Vittorio Brambilla, who was in the Surtees, was hit on the head by a flying wheel. Peterson and Brambilla were taken to hospital, the former with 27 fractures in his legs and feet, and there was a concern for the latter who was unconscious after being hit by the wheel. The rest of the drivers were uninjured, and most of them were able to take the restart.

The race restarted almost four hours after the original start. Again there was confusion as the front-row starters Andretti and Villeneuve went too early, but the rest of the field did not follow, and both Andretti and Villeneuve were handed one-minute penalties as a result. On the track, Villeneuve led ahead of Andretti and Jabouille until Jabouille retired, handing third place on the track to Lauda. His teammate Watson battled with Reutemann and Laffite and eventually pulled away. The battle on the track was between Villeneuve and Andretti, with the Lotus driver passing Villeneuve with five laps left. Andretti crossed the line first, with Villeneuve close behind, but when their one-minute penalties were added, Lauda emerged the victor ahead of Watson and Reutemann.

In a hospital, Peterson had a clot forming in his bloodstream after an operation on his legs, slipped into a coma overnight, and died the following day. This made Andretti the world champion, although he did not celebrate it, and mourned for Peterson along with his fellow drivers. Brambilla was able to recover from his injuries.

Race 15: United States
The season's penultimate round was at Watkins Glen in the United States, and Lotus had hired Jean-Pierre Jarier to replace Peterson. Patrese could not race because the Grand Prix Drivers Association had deemed him responsible for the accident, ultimately killing Peterson.

New World Champion, and home hero, Andretti was shaken up more than most drivers due to Peterson's death, but it did not stop him from romping to pole ahead of Reutemann, with Alan Jones's Williams heading the second row. Andretti kept the lead at the start, with Reutemann and Villeneuve following ahead of Jones. Andretti suffered from an ill-handling car that had brake troubles and was soon passed by Reutemann, Villeneuve, and later Jones. Reutemann and Villeneuve ran 1–2 for Ferrari until Villeneuve's engine blew up. This left Jones second and Andretti third, but Andretti's engine blew up, handing third to Lauda until he also suffered the same fate, thus leaving Scheckter third before a charging Jarier passed him. However, Jarier ran out of fuel with four laps left, giving the place back to Scheckter. Reutemann took a comfortable win from Jones, with Scheckter completing the podium.

Race 16: Canada
The season finished in Canada, coming to the new île Notre-Dame circuit in Montreal; the Formula One circus left the previous Canadian GP location of Mosport Park due to safety issues with the Toronto circuit. In qualifying, Jarier starred by qualifying on pole ahead of Scheckter and home hero Villeneuve. Jarier could easily lead into the first corner, with Jones jumping up to second after a brilliant start and dropping Scheckter down to third. As Jarier began to pull away, Jones suffered a slow puncture and fell down the field as the race progressed, promoting Scheckter to second and Villeneuve to third, and then Villeneuve passed Scheckter mid-race to take second. Jarier continued to dominate until he retired with an oil leak, leaving Villeneuve to take his first career win in his home race ahead of Scheckter, with Reutemann taking third.

Results and standings

Grands Prix

World Drivers' Championship standings

Drivers' Championship points were awarded on a 9–6–4–3–2–1 basis to the top six finishers in each round.

The best seven results from the first eight races and the best seven results from the remaining eight races were retained.

International Cup for F1 Constructors standings

 
Constructors points were awarded on a 9–6–4–3–2–1 basis to the top six placegetters in each round with only the best-placed car from each constructor eligible to score points.
The best seven results from the first eight races and the best seven results from the remaining eight races were retained.

Official FIA results for the 1978 International Cup for F1 Constructors listed the positions as (1) JPS-Lotus (2) Ferrari (3) Brabham-Alfa (4) Elf-Tyrrell (5) Wolf (6) Ligier-Matra (7) Copersucar (8) McLaren (9) Williams & Arrows (11) Shadow (12) Renault (13) Surtees & Ensign.

Non-championship race
A single non-championship Formula One race was held in 1978: the BRDC International Trophy, staged at Silverstone. This was the last time this event was run under Formula One regulations. The race was won by future World Champion Keke Rosberg, driving in only his second Formula One event.

Notes

References

External links
 1978 World Championship race classifications and images at f1-facts.com

Formula One seasons